The Istituto Affari Internazionali (IAI) (English: Institute of International Affairs) is an Italian international relations think tank, and non-profit organisation founded in 1965 by Altiero Spinelli. It is ranked among the global top-20 think tanks in the "Foreign Policy and International Relations", "Defense and National Security", and "Western Europe" categories, according to the 2019 Global Go To Think Tank Index.

History 

Altiero Spinelli was the institute's first director, thanks to joint contributions from the Fondazione Olivetti, the cultural and political association Il Mulino and the Nord e Sud Research Center, as well as to substantial support from the Ford Foundation. Spinelli took North American and British think tanks as a model: he created a flexible private organization, distinct from university institutes and governmental or ministerial research centers, yet capable of inter-acting and cooperating with the government, the public administration, national economic actors and foreign academic centers. These are still the IAI's outstanding features today. In September 2020 the Institute moved to Palazzo Cipolla, an elegant Neo-Renaissance building in the heart of Rome. The Institute's main objective is to promote an understanding of the problems of international politics through studies, research, training, meetings and publications, with the aim of increasing the opportunities of all countries to move in the direction of supranational organization, democratic freedom and social justice (IAI Statute, Article 1).

Research

Research focuses on the following thematic areas:
	European Union, politics and institutions
	Global actors (United States, Latin America, Asia, Africa)
	Eastern Europe and Eurasia (Turkey, Balkans, Caucasus, Ukraine)
	Mediterranean and Middle East
	Security and defence
	Energy and climate
	Multilateralism and global governance (international political economy, WTO, G7)
	Italy's foreign policy
	Technology and international relations

The research staff is made up of nearly 40 researchers, including area or project directors. Most of the research projects are carried out together with other institutes with similar characteristics.

The Institute is an active participant in – and has sometimes even been a promoter of – important transnational research networks:
	Council of Councils
	EuroMeSCo (EuroMediterranean Study Commission)
	ETTG (European Think Tanks Group)
	New-Med (OSCE New-Med Track II Network)
	TEPSA (Trans European Policy Studies Association)

Publications

 The International Spectator, a peer reviewed English-language international relations quarterly, published by Routledge (Taylor & Francis Group)
 Global Politics and Security, a series of books on topical questions in international relations and contemporary history, published by Peter Lang
 IAI Research Studies and Quaderni IAI, two series of books on problems of international affairs in either English or Italian
 IAI Papers and Documenti IAI, two series of papers produced within the context of IAI research projects and areas of expertise
 IAI Commentaries, op-eds on a variety of contemporary issues in Italian and global affairs
 AffarInternazionali, an Italian language webzine on politics, strategy and economics

In addition, the IAI manages three websites:
	iai.it/en: the IAI's official website
	Affarinternazionali.it: the site of the webzine by the same name
	New-Med Research Network: site on the Mediterranean

Footnotes

Bibliography

See also

 Altiero Spinelli
 Foreign relations of Italy
 International affairs
 Think tank

External links
 The IAI's official website

Think tanks based in Italy
Foreign policy and strategy think tanks
Political and economic think tanks based in Europe
Non-profit organisations based in Italy
Think tanks established in 1965
Research institutes in Italy
Research institutes of international relations
Organizations established in 1965